HaHotrim (lit. The Rowers) is a kibbutz in northern Israel. Located near Tirat Carmel, it falls under the jurisdiction of Hof HaCarmel Regional Council.

History
The beginnings of the kibbutz were in December 1941, with the formation of a work company near Kiryat Haim by Jewish refugees from Czechoslovakia and Germany. The kibbutz was established in 1952 on the land of a depopulated  Palestinian  village named al-Tira.

References

External links

Official website 
Kibbutz Hahotrim Collection (in Hebrew) on the Digital collections of Younes and Soraya Nazarian Library, University of Haifa

Kibbutzim
Kibbutz Movement
Populated places established in 1952
Populated places in Haifa District
1952 establishments in Israel
Czech-Jewish culture in Israel
German-Jewish culture in Israel
Slovak-Jewish culture in Israel